Branko Kralj (10 March 1924 – 18 December 2012) was a Croatian footballer who played as goalkeeper. He was born and died in Zagreb.

Club career
Kralj joined local side HŠK Concordia in 1938. After World War II when the club was disbanded he joined NK Borac. Borac later merged into today's NK Zagreb and Kralj moved to local powerhouse Dinamo Zagreb. During his time with Dinamo he appeared in a total of 108 matches (including 61 Yugoslav First League games) and helped the club win the 1953–54 championship title. He retired the following season after sustaining a career-ending injury during a match against Velež Mostar.

International career
He was called up for Yugoslavia 39 times during his time at Dinamo, but always as a substitute for the team's first-choice goalkeeper Vladimir Beara of Hajduk Split. He eventually earned three caps for the national team, each time coming on as a substitute for Beara between 1954 and 1955, and was a member of the Yugoslav squad which reached the quarter-final in the 1954 World Cup in Switzerland. He was also part of Yugoslavia's squad at the 1952 Summer Olympics, but he did not play in any matches.

After retiring from active football he graduated from the Faculty of Economics at the University of Zagreb and worked in Dinamo's club management.

References

External links
 
Branko Kralj at the Serbia national football team website 
Branko Kralj's obituary 

1924 births
2012 deaths
Footballers from Zagreb
Association football goalkeepers
Yugoslav footballers
Yugoslavia international footballers
1954 FIFA World Cup players
HŠK Concordia players
NK Zagreb players
GNK Dinamo Zagreb players
Yugoslav First League players
Faculty of Economics and Business, University of Zagreb alumni